California's 43rd district may refer to:

 California's 43rd congressional district
 California's 43rd State Assembly district